Herp usually refers to many amphibians and reptiles, as studied in herpetology.

Herp may also refer to:
 Hendrik Herp (died 1477), Franciscan and writer on mysticism
 Joan Herp (born 1993), Spanish sailor

See also
 Van Herp, a surname (with a list of people of this name)